Rubus spectabilis, the salmonberry, is a species of bramble in the rose family Rosaceae, native to the west coast of North America from west-central Alaska to California, inland as far as Idaho. Like many other species in the genus Rubus, the salmonberry plant bears edible fruit, typically yellow-orange or red in color, resembling raspberries in appearance.

Description
It has perennial (not biennial) woody stems that are covered with fine prickles, especially on new growth. The plant has golden or yellowish brown erect or arching stems (also known as "canes") that often form thickets, like many other brambles in the genus Rubus. The margins of the leaflets are doubly serrate. The leaves are also stipulate and are smooth to slightly hairy on the top surface, compared to the underside, which are typically more pale and hairy. In late fall and winter months, salmonberry leaves will fall, and the plant remains dormant or maintains minimal shoot elongation during the winter.

The flowers are perfect (bisexual), containing 75–100 stamens and many individual pistils with superior ovaries. While fruit production is largely dependent on the environment, there is an estimated growth of 30 fruits per 3m^2 (32 ft^2) and 17-65 seeds per fruit. Seeds Salmonberry sprout mainly from the buds found on rhizomes, stumps, and root crowns of the plant. The flowers cannot self-pollinate and are instead pollinated by insects, hummingbirds, and beetles.

Salmonberries ripen approximately 30–36 days after pollination, from early May to late July in most of the Pacific Northwest and July to August in cooler Northern climates. The fruit pulls away from its receptacle, differentiating it from blackberries. Botanically speaking, the salmonberry is not a true berry, but instead an aggregate fruit made of many smaller drupelets. The fruits of the salmonberry plant exhibit polymorphism, as berries are often either red in color or a yellow-orange color. Studies have found that although both red and yellow-orange morphs have similar physical qualities, the red berries are more commonly consumed by birds, although this is likely not a strong enough selective pressure to determine color morph distribution alone; factors such as soil type (which affects germination), along with other unstudied factors are more likely responsible for the color polymorphism.

A similar species from Japan, the red-flowered raspberry (ベニバナイチゴ) was once considered a subspecies as R. spectabilis subsp. vernus. It is now reclassified as R. vernus.

Distribution and habitat
Salmonberries are typically found in coastal areas with nitrogen-rich soils, in moist to wet forests and streambanks, increasing in abundance in areas of high rainfall and decreasing in abundance at higher elevations and continentality. Ecologically speaking, salmonberry tends to spread quickly and needs plenty of room to grow, and is often dominant and fast-growing in early-seral communities. Its size and population growth decline in abundance as the canopy begins to form, and may also be influenced by other factors such as basal area, plant disturbance, and population density. In open areas they often form large thickets, and are found to associate with stands of red alder (Alnus rubra), lady fern (Athyrium filixfemina), western skunk cabbage (Lysichitum americanum), devil's club (Oplopanax horridus), thimbleberry (Rubus parviflorus), and threeleaf foamflower (Tiarella trifoliata).

Ecology
In the wild, the fruit are typically eaten by birds, bears, and small mammals, among others, while the leaves, twigs, and stems are grazed on by herbivores such as deer, moose, mountain goats, elk, and rabbits. Populations of dense thicket growth can provide escape habitats for small animals, as well as nesting sites for birds.

In the spring, salmonberry flowering coincides with the migration of certain species of hummingbirds, which is crucial for its pollination. Birds and mammals also help with dispersion of seeds through their feces, while rodents and other burrowing animals may further help with dispersion. Some notable mammals crucial for the dispersion of seeds are the grizzly and American black bears, which can deposit 50,000 to 100,000 seeds in one pile of feces.

Salmonberry have several traits that make it highly resistant to fire. Rhizomes and root crowns below the soil surface usually survive, even if top stems are burned. Depending on burial depth, seeds also often remain unharmed. Additionally, the plant tend to quickly sprout after fires, allowing for rapid growth and regeneration.

Salmonberries are susceptible to many diseases, including mildew, fruit rot, rust, root rot, and viral and bacterial diseases. Their fruits, foliage, canes, roots, and crowns may also be damaged by pests such as beetles, aphids, mites, moths, among others.

Uses
Salmonberries are edible. The fruit has been referred to as "insipid", but depending on ripeness and site, they are good eaten raw  whether red or golden  and when processed into jam, candy, jelly and wine. Native American people ate the young shoots or used it as a medicinal plant. The shoots were harvested during April to early June before they turned woody or tough, and were peeled, then steamed, boiled, or pit-cooked, and eaten (or less commonly, eaten raw). Traditionally, the berries and sprouts were also eaten with salmon or mixed with oolichan grease or salmon roe. They were not dried because of their high moisture content. It is still used as a food source and medicinal plant in regions of Alaska today.

Other uses by Native Americans include:

 Boiling the leaves with fish as a flavoring (by the Nuu-chah-nulth people)
 Using the leaves to line baskets, wipe fish, and cover cooking pits (by the Kaigani Haida people)
 Using the branches as a pipe stem (by the Makah people)
 Chewing and spitting the leaves (or bark in the winter) onto a burn as a treatment due to their astringent qualities (by the Quileute people)
 Boiling the bark in seawater to create a brew to clean infected wounds (especially burns) as well as reduce labor pains (by the Quinault people)

It is also widely grown as an ornamental plant for its flowers, with a double-flowered clone identified in Washington and British Columbia. R. spectabilis has escaped cultivation and become naturalized in parts of northwestern Europe, including Great Britain, Ireland and the Faroe Islands.

References

External links

 
 
Czech Botany, Rubus spectabilis Pursh – ostružiník / ostružina in Czech with color photos of flowers, fruits, and leaves
US National Forest Service, Index of Species Information
University of Washington plant data sheet
 

spectabilis
Berries
Edible fruits
Flora of the Western United States
Flora of British Columbia
Flora of Alaska
Garden plants of North America
Plants described in 1813
Flora without expected TNC conservation status